NGC 533 is an elliptical galaxy in the constellation Cetus. It was discovered on October 8, 1785 by William Herschel. It was described as "pretty bright, pretty large, round, gradually brighter middle" by John Louis Emil Dreyer, the compiler of the New General Catalogue.

References

Notes

External links 
 

Cetus (constellation)
Elliptical galaxies
0533
005283
00992